Synsepalum tsounkpe is a species of tree in the family Sapotaceae with edible fruit. It is endemic to Côte d'Ivoire.  It is threatened by habitat loss.

References

tsounkpe
Endemic flora of Ivory Coast
Trees of Africa
Endangered flora of Africa
Taxonomy articles created by Polbot
Taxa named by François Pellegrin
Taxa named by André Aubréville